Bhatgaon may refer to:

 Bhatgaon, Nepal, a town about 8 km from Kathmandu
 Bhatgaon, Raipur, a town in Chhattisgarh, India
 Bhatgaon, Surajpur, a town in Chhattisgarh, India
 Bhatgaon, Lucknow, a village in Uttar Pradesh, India